This is a list of bills sponsored by John McCain in the United States Senate.

Number by Congress 
100th United States Congress: 39 bills sponsored
101st United States Congress: 63 bills sponsored
102nd United States Congress: 211 bills sponsored
103rd United States Congress: 144 bills sponsored
104th United States Congress: 217 bills sponsored – 8 became law
105th United States Congress: 224 bills sponsored – 3 became law.
106th United States Congress: 167 bills sponsored
107th United States Congress: 232 bills sponsored
108th United States Congress: 189 bills sponsored – 2 became law.
109th United States Congress: 143 bills sponsored – 4 became law.
110th United States Congress: 38 bills sponsored

Specific bills and acts 
Climate Stewardship Acts: Co-sponsor Joe Lieberman. (failed)
Bipartisan Campaign Reform Act: Co-sponsor Russ Feingold.
Detainee Treatment Act

See also 
House and Senate career of John McCain, until 2000
Senate career of John McCain, 2001–present

Legislation
McCain, John